Robert Vescovo (born January 6, 1977) is an American politician serving in the Missouri House of Representatives and is currently serving as the Speaker of the Missouri House of Representatives since 2021. A member of the Republican Party, he previously served as Majority Floor Leader for 4 years.

Personal life and family
Vescovo is married, he and his wife Amanda have five children.

Political career
First elected in 2014 Vescovo defeated challenger Benjamin Hagin to win a third term in the Missouri House of Representatives representing District 112 which covers parts of north and central Jefferson County, Missouri.

Electoral history

Political positions
On Abortion, Vescovo describes himself as "100 percent pro-life.”

References

|-

1977 births
21st-century American politicians
Living people
Politicians from St. Louis
Republican Party members of the Missouri House of Representatives
Southeast Missouri State University alumni
Speakers of the Missouri House of Representatives